Ambrose Lawrence  (1816-1893)  was a dentist who served as the eleventh mayor of Lowell, Massachusetts.

Lawrence was elected mayor in December 1854 as a member of the Know Nothings. He had previously been a member of the Whig Party. He was also a member of the Independent Order of Odd Fellows, serving as Grand Patriarch for Massachusetts during the 1880s.

References

1816 births
1893 deaths
Mayors of Lowell, Massachusetts
American dentists
People from Boscawen, New Hampshire
Lowell, Massachusetts City Council members
19th-century American politicians
19th-century dentists